San Cisco is the debut studio album by the Australian indie rock band San Cisco. It was released in Australia on 23 November 2012 and internationally on 16 July 2013. The album peaked at number 17 on the ARIA Chart.

Track listing

Charts

Release history

References

2012 debut albums
San Cisco albums